Duck Creek Village is an unincorporated community in Kane County, Utah, United States.

Description
Duck Creek Village has a post office with the ZIP code of 84762.

See also

References

External links

 

Unincorporated communities in Kane County, Utah
Unincorporated communities in Utah